Anarsia chiangmaiensis is a moth in the family Gelechiidae. It was described by Kyu-Tek Park and Margarita Gennadievna Ponomarenko in 1996. It is found in Thailand.

The wingspan is 12-12.5 mm. The forewings are pale orange grey with a semi-ovate costal mark, two streaks on the costa at one-third and one-fourth and another at three-fourths beyond the costal mark. The hindwings are grey.

References

chiangmaiensis
Moths described in 1996
Moths of Asia